Pablo Gonçalves Maia Fortunato (born 10 January 2002) is a Brazilian professional footballer who plays as an midfielder for São Paulo.

Career statistics

Club

References

2002 births
Living people
Sportspeople from Minas Gerais
Brazilian footballers
Association football midfielders
Independente Futebol Clube players
Associação Atlética Portuguesa (Santos) players
São Paulo FC players